The 1990 Trans America Athletic Conference men's basketball tournament (now known as the ASUN men's basketball tournament) was held March 6–8 at Barton Coliseum in Little Rock, Arkansas.

In a rematch of the 1989 final, Arkansas–Little Rock upset top-seeded  in the championship game, 105–95, to win their third (and second consecutive) TAAC/Atlantic Sun men's basketball tournament. 

The Trojans, therefore, received the TAAC's automatic bid to the 1990 NCAA tournament, where they lost to eventual-champion UNLV in the first round.

Houston Baptist departed the TAAC prior to the season, leaving the conference membership at nine. Nonetheless, only the top eight teams in the conference standings were invited to the tournament.

Bracket

References

ASUN men's basketball tournament
Tournament
TAAC men's basketball tournament
TAAC men's basketball tournament